Roc-La-Familia was an American record label founded by Shawn "JAY-Z" Carter. This sub-label focused on signing international artists, including reggaeton artists, much like Bad Boy Latino. "OG" Juan Perez was appointed the president of the label Robert Castillo EVP and Cipha Sounds was the senior vice president of A&R (until he got a job at MTV in 2006). Roc La Familia was an extension of Roc-A-Fella Records and headquartered in New York City. Roc La Familia featured a broad array of artists encompassing such musical genres as Latin hip hop, reggae, reggaeton, pop, rock and more. The first signee to the label was Houston based rapper Aztek Escobar. The only albums released from the label came from famed artists Héctor el Father (Roc La Familia & Héctor 'El Father' Present Los Rompe Discotekas—June 27, 2006), Dimitri "El Boss", N.O.R.E. (N.O.R.E. y la Familia...Ya Tú Sabe—July 18, 2006). Roc La Familia has since folded. The whole staff has reportedly been dismissed. A number of artists, such as N.O.R.E. have been complaining of the lack of promotion for some time. They plan on releasing a  greatest hits CD, which will allegedly fulfill a contractual obligation with Def Jam. It has been reported that Roc La Familia will not be re-established.

Former Artists 
 Héctor el Father
 N.O.R.E.
 Aztek Escobar
 Tru-Life
 Dimitri "El Boss"

Discography

Unreleased Albums 
 BAHATI
 N.O.R.E. - 1 Fan A Day 
 N.O.R.E. - Norminacle 
 Aztek Escobar - Columbian Necktie
 Dimitri "El Boss"- Les Rompes Clan de Latinoamericano Cartel De Reggaeton(Ultimo Edition)

References 

American record labels
Defunct record labels of the United States
Hip hop record labels
Latin American music record labels
Pop record labels
Record labels disestablished in 2007
Record labels established in 2005
Reggae record labels